Dagomys railway station is a railway station of the North Caucasus Railway, a subsidiary of Russian Railways, located in Dagomys Microdistrict, Lazarevsky City District of Sochi, Krasnodar Krai, Russia.

History
The station was opened in 1929. In Soviet times, the station served as a stopping point for some long-distance passenger trains. Later on, only local electric commuter trains called at the station. Because the long-distance trains did not stop here anymore, Dagomys suffered from the reduction of the number of tourists.

As of 2014, all local trains connecting Sochi and Tuapse via Lazarevskaya called at Dagomys, while long-distance trains did not stop. In 2013, construction of a new station building and modern terminals began for the upcoming 2014 Winter Olympics.

References

Railway stations in Sochi
Railway stations in Russia opened in 1929